The Siahkal incident or Siahkal movement refers to a guerrilla operation against Pahlavi government organized by Iranian People's Fadaee Guerrillas that happened near Siahkal town in Gilan on February 8, 1971. The guerrillas attacked a gendarmerie post at Siahkal, killing three policemen and freeing two previously arrested guerrillas.

Thirteen men were convicted and executed for the incident, including two who were in prison at the time.

The event marks the beginning of the guerrilla era in Iran for most historians — an era which ended with the Islamic Revolution.

References and notes

Modern history of Iran
Militant opposition to the Pahlavi dynasty
1971 in Iran